Vali-Cătălin Mureșan (née Mototolea; born 3 June 1990) is a Romanian rugby union football player. He plays as a flanker.

Career

Before joining Steaua, Vali-Cătălin Mureșan played for SuperLiga counterparts Farul Constanța from where he moved to Steaua in 2015.

References

External links

 
 
 
 

1990 births
Living people
People from Brăila
Romanian rugby union players
CSA Steaua București (rugby union) players
RCJ Farul Constanța players
București Wolves players
Rugby union flankers